Harar City Football Club (Amharic: ሀረር ከተማ እግር ኳስ ክለብ) is a professional Ethiopian football club based in Harar. They are a member of the Ethiopian Football Federation and play in the Ethiopian First League, the third division of Ethiopian football.

History 
The club was founded and originally operated by Harar Brewary as Harar Beer F.C. The club enjoyed a 12 year stay in the Ethiopian Premier League before being relegated after the 2013-14 season.  

In 2014, the club was sold by the brewery to local investors and subsequently had its name changed to Harar City F.C.

Stadium 
The club currently plays its home matches at Harar Stadium, although it may be replaced by Aw Abadir Stadium. The new stadium is currently unfinished, but is scheduled to be completed in 2023, according to Harari Region president Ordin Bedri.

Academy 
The club previously had U17 team that produced such players as Abubeker Nassir.

Honors

Domestic 
Ethiopian Cup: 1
 2007

African
CAF Confederation Cup: 1 appearance
2008 – Preliminary Round

Former coaches 

 Tsegaye Kedanemariam (2006–11)

Former players 
  Abel Yalew 
  Abubeker Nassir

See also
 Harar Brewery

References

External links
Team profile – soccerway.com

Football clubs in Ethiopia
Works association football clubs in Ethiopia
Harari Region